The Last Outlaw is a 1919 American short silent Western film directed by John Ford. Only the first reel of the film survives, in the British Film Institute film archive and in the Museum of Modern Art film archive.

Cast
 Edgar Jones 
 Lucille Hutton
 Richard Cummings
 Jack Walters

References

External links
 

1919 films
1919 short films
1919 Western (genre) films
American silent short films
American black-and-white films
Films directed by John Ford
Silent American Western (genre) films
1910s American films
1910s English-language films